Parliamentary elections were held in Poland on 27 October 1991 to elect deputies to both houses of the National Assembly. The 1991 election was notable on several counts.  It was the first parliamentary election to be held since the formation of the Third Republic, the first entirely free and competitive legislative election since the fall of communism, the first completely free legislative election of any sort since 1928, and only the fifth completely free election in all of Polish history. Due to the collapse of the Solidarity movement's political wing, the 1991 election saw deep political fragmentation, with a multitude of new parties and alliances emerging in its wake. Low voting thresholds within individual constituencies, along with a five percent national threshold allocated to a small portion of the Sejm, additionally contributed to party fragmentation. As a result, 29 political parties gained entry into the Sejm and 22 in the Senate, with no party holding a decisive majority. Two months of intense coalition negotiations followed, with Jan Olszewski of the Centre Agreement forming a minority government along with the Christian National Union, remnants of the broader Center Civic Alliance, and the Peasants' Agreement, with conditional support from Polish People's Party, Solidarity and other minor parties.

460 members of parliament (poseł) were elected; 391 from 6980 candidates from 37 regional lists of candidates and 69 from country-wide lists of candidates. In the Sejm elections, 27,517,280 citizens were eligible to vote, 11,887,949 (43.2%) of them cast their votes and 11,218,602 (94.4%) of the votes were counted as valid. In the Senate elections, 43.2% of citizens cast their votes, 96.5% were valid.

Elections were supervised by the National Electoral Commission (Państwowa Komisja Wyborcza). 37 regional (okręgowe) commissions were formed, and 22,341 district (obwodowe), staffed by 197,389 citizens.

A remarkable 111 parties competed and 29 parties (listed below) won Parliamentary seats. The success of the satirical Polish Beer-Lovers' Party with 16 seats gained news coverage worldwide.

Results

Sejm

Senate

References

Obwieszczenie Państwowej Komisji Wyborczej z dn. 31 X 1991 r., Monitor Polski. Nr 41, poz. 288
Obwieszczenie PKW z dn. 30 X 1991 r., M.P. Nr 41, poz. 287

Poland
Parliamentary elections in Poland
1991 elections in Poland
History of Poland (1989–present)
October 1991 events in Europe